Josef Kvída (born 16 January 1997) is a Czech professional footballer who plays as a defender for Cypriot club Pafos.

Club career
After starting his career with Příbram, Kvida joined Dutch side PEC Zwolle in July 2015. On 3 December 2016, after appearing on the substitutes bench for PEC Zwolle multiple times, Kvida finally made his debut in a 3–1 away defeat against Vitesse, playing the full 90 minutes. On 17 August 2017, Kvída was sent on loan to Almere City. On 4 July 2018, it was announced he had joined Eerste Divisie side NEC on a free transfer.

Career statistics

References

External links

National Team profile

1997 births
Sportspeople from Příbram
Living people
Czech footballers
Czech Republic youth international footballers
Association football defenders
1. FK Příbram players
PEC Zwolle players
Almere City FC players
NEC Nijmegen players
Pafos FC players
Eredivisie players
Eerste Divisie players
Cypriot First Division players
Czech expatriate footballers
Expatriate footballers in the Netherlands
Czech expatriate sportspeople in the Netherlands
Expatriate footballers in Cyprus
Czech expatriate sportspeople in Cyprus